Scrapbooking is a method of preserving, presenting and arranging personal and family history in the form of a book, box or card. Typical memorabilia include photographs, printed media, and artwork. Scrapbook albums are often decorated and frequently contain extensive journal entries or written descriptions. Scrapbooking started in the United Kingdom in the nineteenth century.

History 
In the 15th century, commonplace books, popular in England, emerged as a way to compile information that included recipes, quotations, letters, poems and more. Each commonplace book was unique to its creator's particular interests. Friendship albums became popular in the 16th century. These albums were used much like modern day yearbooks, where friends or patrons would enter their names, titles and short texts or illustrations at the request of the album's owner. These albums were often created as souvenirs of European tours and would contain local memorabilia including coats of arms or works of art commissioned by local artisans. Starting in 1570, it became fashionable to incorporate colored plates depicting popular scenes such as Venetian costumes or Carnival scenes. These provided affordable options as compared to original works and, as such, these plates were not sold to commemorate or document a specific event, but specifically as embellishments for albums. In 1775, James Granger published a history of England with several blank pages at the end of the book. The pages were designed to allow the book's owner to personalize the book with their own memorabilia. The practice of pasting engravings, lithographs and other illustrations into books, or even taking the books apart, inserting new matter, and rebinding them, became known as extra-illustrating or grangerizing.

Additionally, friendship albums, confession albums, and school yearbooks afforded girls in the 18th and 19th centuries an outlet through which to share their literary skills, and allowed girls an opportunity to document their own personalized historical record previously not readily available to them. In "Negotiating Intimacy in British Romantic Friendship Albums," Renee Bryzik has analyzed five albums from the Pfozheimer archive at the New York Public Library that illustrate the practice's range in style and content. 

 For example, college women around the turn of the century used scrapbooks extensively to construct representations of their everyday life as students. Without photograph albums to provide images of these life events, students created unique representations through scrapbooks in order to illustrate their lives using ephemera and memorabilia. A guest list or group of visiting cards might represent a young woman's visit to a party. A playbill and ticket stub might serve as reminders of a trip to New York to see a Broadway show. Solid objects such as plants, silverware, or small trinkets were also used when further visual representation was needed. 
A page from these subject-based scrapbooks might include class schedules, exam booklets, letters from professors, or other printed material from school events. Thus scrapbooks from this era can create a more complete image of their maker's life.

During the 19th century, scrapbooking was seen as a more involved way to preserve one's experiences than journaling or other writing-based forms of logging. Printed material such as cheap newspapers, visiting cards, playbills, and pamphlets circulated widely during the 19th century and often became the primary components of peoples’ scrapbooks. The growing volume of ephemera of this kind, parallel to the growth of industrialized society, created a demand for methods of cataloguing and preserving them. This is why scrapbooks devoted solely to cataloguing recipes, coupons, or other lists were also common during this time. Until later in the 19th century, scrapbooks were seen as functional as well as aesthetically pleasing. Several factors, including marketing strategies and technological advancement, contributed to the image of scrapbooking moving further toward the aesthetic plane over the years.

The advent of modern photography began with the first permanent photograph created by Joseph Nicéphore Niépce in 1826. This allowed the average person to begin to incorporate photographs into their scrapbooks. However, books or albums made specifically for showcasing photographs alone were not popularized in the United States until closer to 1860. Before that point, photographs were not thought of as items to be reproduced and shared. Demand for photo albums was spurred on in large part by the growing popularity of the carte de visite, a small photograph distributed in the same manner one might a visiting card. 
 
Old scrapbooks tended to have photos mounted with photomounting corners and perhaps notations of who was in a photo or where and when it was taken. They often included bits of memorabilia like newspaper clippings, letters, etc. An early known American scrapbooker and inventor of scrapbooking supplies was Mark Twain. Twain carried scrapbooks on his travels as he collected souvenirs, clippings and pictures. Various individuals and communities created scrapbooks throughout the twentieth century in Britain. Among the most ardent scrapbookers of the 18th century was William Henry Dorsey, an artist who collected documents, paintings and artifact pertaining to Black history. Dorsey compiled hundreds of scrapbooks on the lives of Black people during the 18th century and built a collection that he laid out in his home in Philadelphia.

Modern scrapbooking

Marielen Wadley Christensen (pronounced as the names "Mary Ellen"), of Elk Ridge, Utah, United States (formerly of Spanish Fork, Utah) is credited with turning scrapbooking from what was once just the ages-old hobby into the actual industry containing businesses devoted specifically to the manufacturing and sale of scrapbooking supplies. She began designing creative pages for her family's photo memories, inserting the completed pages into sheet protectors collected in 3-ring binders. By 1980, she had assembled over fifty volumes and was invited to display them at the World Conference on Records in Salt Lake City. In 1981 Marielen and her husband Anthony Jay ("A.J.") authored and published a how-to booklet, Keeping Memories Alive, and opened a scrapbook store in Spanish Fork that ended up with the same name, that remains open today.

In addition to preserving memories, the hobby is popular for the strong social network that scrapbooking can provide. Hobbyists, known as "scrappers" or "scrapbookers", get together and scrapbook at each other's homes, local scrapbook stores, scrapbooking conventions, retreat centers, and even on cruises. The term "crop", a reference to cropping or trimming printed photographs, was coined to describe these events.

Following the lead of Keeping Memories Alive (which was originally in the smaller building next door and named The Annex in its early years), many other stores have popped up and cater to the scrapbooking community. These shops provide many of the necessary tools for every scrapbooker's needs. Besides Keeping Memories Alive, these include companies such as Creative Memories, Making Memories, Stampin' Up!, and Close to My Heart.

The scrapbooking industry doubled in size between 2001 and 2004 to $2.5 billion with over 1,600 companies creating scrapbooking products by 2003. Creative Memories, a home-based retailer of scrapbooking supplies founded in 1987, saw $425 million in retail sales in 2004. Creative Memories' parent company did file Chapter 11 in 2013 and became the bankruptcy with the largest debt in the Twin City area.

According to Google Trends, the search terms related to scrapbook and scrapbooking have seen a 70 percent decline since its peak in 2005–2006. However, there is much debate among the community of people who engage in memory keeping about what the decline means for the health and future of the industry as a whole. What seems to be clear is that traditional scrapbooking is once again in a transition period due to many forces including current economic issues, the influence of social media and the ease of digital sharing, and the rejection of the stereotype of traditional scrapbooks being something that is for older women. However, if one takes a closer look, it is easy to see all the ways people continue memory keeping even if it doesn't fall strictly within the definition of traditional scrapbooking as defined here.

Some examples include the advent of Smash books created by EK Success, which in some ways, are a closer representation to original scrapbooks in that they are wire bound books in a variety of sizes consisting of blank printed background papers into which one can journal and glue mementos into.

Another variation is the introduction and growth of pocket scrapbooking, most well known and represented by Project Life created and introduced by Becky Higgins. Higgins created the system in response to her personal desire to continue record the lives of her children and family, but in a quicker, more simple way that allowed her the flexibility to complete the project, but still in an attractive, cohesive way.

One of the newest trends into scrapbooking is bringing the layout designs down to a much smaller size.  Small enough to carry in a small bag with on the go updates and area for creativity and memory keeping. A traditional traveler's notebook is a simple leather cover with a band to keep closed. The cover can hold up to six inserts which can be used in many ways. The notebook has grown in popularity, allowing for journaling and memory keeping for any interests.

Mini albums are another great way of memory keeping and a new trend in scrapbooking. They can be made in different sizes based on the number of photos to be put inside the album. These mini albums can be constructed and hand made from scratch.

Media

Materials
The most important scrapbooking supply is the album itself, which can be permanently bound, or allow for the insertion of pages. There are other formats such as mini albums and accordion-style fold-out albums. Some of these are adhered to various containers, such as matchbooks, CD cases, or other small holders. When scrap artists started moving away from the "page" and onto alternative surfaces and objectives, they termed these creations "altered items" or now simply called "off-the-page". This movement circles back to the history of art from the 1960s when Louise Nevelson was doing "Assemblages" with found objects and recycled parts.

Modern scrapbooking is done largely on 12 inch (30 cm) square or letter-size (US Letter (8.5 by 11 inch) or A4 (210 by 297 mm)) pages. More recently, smaller albums have become popular. The most common new formats are 6, 7, or 8-inch (15, 17.5, or 20 cm) square. It is important to many scrappers to protect their pages with clear page protectors.

Basic materials include background papers (including printed and cardstock paper), photo corner mounts (or other means of mounting photos such as adhesive dots, photo mounting tape, or acid-free glue), scissors, a paper trimmer or cutting tool, art pens, archival pens for journaling, and mounting glues (like thermo-tac). More elaborate designs require more specialized tools such as die cut templates, rubber stamps, craft punches, stencils, inking tools, eyelet setters, heat embossing tools and personal die cut machines. A lot of time people who enjoy scrapbooking will create their own background papers by using the tools mentioned along with "fancy" textured scissors.

Various accessories, referred to as "embellishments", are used to decorate scrapbook pages. Embellishments include stickers, rub-ons, stamps, eyelets, brads, chipboard elements in various shapes, alphabet letters, lace, wire, fabric, beads, sequins, and ribbon. The use of die cut machines is also increasingly popular; in recent years a number of electronic die-cutting machines resembling a plotter with a drag knife have hit the market (e.g. The Cricut), enabling scrappers to use their computer to create die cuts out of any shape or font with the use of free or third party software. Scrapbook makers will also use magazine clippings to "decorate" a scrapbook.

One of the key components of modern scrapbooking is the archival quality of the supplies. Designed to preserve photographs and journaling in their original state, materials encouraged by most serious scrapbookers are of a higher quality than those of many typical photo albums commercially available. Scrappers insist on acid-free, lignin-free papers, stamp ink, and embossing powder. They also use pigment-based inks, which are fade resistant, colorfast, and often waterproof. Many scrappers use buffered paper, which will protect photos from acid in memorabilia used in the scrapbook. Older "magnetic" albums are not acid-free and thus cause damage to the photos and memorabilia included in them. Gloves, too, are used to protect photos from the oil on hands.

An international standard, ISO 18902, provides specific guidelines on materials that are safe for scrapbooking through its requirements for albums, framing, and storage materials. ISO 18902 includes requirements for photo-safety and a specific pH range for acid-free materials. ISO 18902 prohibits the use of harmful materials, including Polyvinyl chloride (PVC) and Cellulose nitrate.

Digital scrapbooking

The advent of scanners, desktop publishing, page layout programs, and advanced printing options make it relatively easy to create professional-looking layouts in digital form. The internet allows scrapbookers to self-publish their work. Scrapbooks that exist completely in digital image form are referred to as "digital scrapbooks" or "computer scrapbooks".

While some people prefer the physicality of the actual artifacts they paste onto the pages of books, the digital scrapbooking hobby has grown in popularity in recent years. Some of the advantages include a greater diversity of materials, less environmental impact, cost savings, the ability to share finished pages more readily on the internet, and the use of image editing software to experiment with manipulating page elements in multiple ways without making permanent adjustments. A traditional scrapbook layout may employ a background paper with a torn edge. While a physical page can only be torn once and never restored, a digital paper can be torn and untorn with ease, allowing the scrapbooker to try out different looks without wasting supplies. Some web-based digital scrapbooks include a variety of wallpapers and backgrounds to help the users create a rich visual experience. Each paper, photo, or embellishment exists on its own layer in your document, and you can reposition them at your discretion.

Furthermore, digital scrapbooking is not limited to digital storage and display. Many digital scrappers print their finished layouts to be stored in scrapbook albums. Others have books professionally printed in hard bound books to be saved as keepsakes. Professional printing- and binding-services offer free software to create scrapbooks with professional layouts and individual layout capabilities. Because of the integrated design and order workflow, real hardcover bound books can be produced more cost effectively.

Early digital scrapbooks were created from digital photos uploaded to an external site. Over time, this moved to a model of downloading software onto a personal computer that will organize photos and help create the digital scrapbook. With the growth of Web 2.0 functionality, digital scrapbooking is going back online, to avoid the hassles of having to download and install PC software. The availability of cheap online storage (e.g., on Amazon's S3 service), and the desire to leverage pre-uploaded online albums (e.g., on Yahoo's Flickr) make it more convenient for users to directly compose their digital scrapbooks online. Print on demand fulfillment enables such digital scrapbooks to effectively supplant traditional scrapbooks.

Digital scrapbooking has advanced to the point where digital scrapbook layouts may be made entirely online using Web-based software. Users upload their photos, create a digital scrapbook layout using a Web page and digital scrapbook graphics. The layout can then be downloaded as a low-resolution JPEG file for sharing on the Web or as a high-resolution JPEG file for printing.

Crops

Scrapbooking crops (or "Crops") are events where 2 or more scrapbookers gather to work in a social circle on their books, cards or other projects.  It is similar to the old quilting bees that used to be socially prevalent, but has been replaced by today's "Crop". Attendees bring specific supplies themselves to work on said projects and sometimes there are vendors at these events to purchase any extra scrapbooking needs. At these events ideas are shared, techniques are taught to one another, products used (e.g. cutting machines such as, Silhouette & Cricut) are learned about and attendees have a few hours to days of uninterrupted time to work on their scrapbooks, cards, or any project they are needing to accomplish.  Events are planned informally at one's home, a church hall or establishments with meeting rooms to the larger attended crops that encompass days of time in a hotel, where the attendee stays in the same hotel and works in the large ballroom or conference rooms in the hotel with tens to hundreds of attendees.  Some of the ways to learn about events are mainly through word of mouth, social media and community postings.

Industry statistics
Some people attribute the increased interest in scrapbooking to a renewed passion for genealogy, while others say that it is an outlet for those interested in photography and graphic design.

For evidence of interest in scrapbooking, consider the following facts:

 Over 4 million women in the United States alone consider themselves to be scrapbookers.
 Over 4% of all women in U.S. have done traditional scrapbooking. Millions of others do various aspects of photo books but are not scrapbookers.
 Scrapbooking is one of the largest categories within the craft and hobby industry and now considered to be the third most popular craft in the nation. From 1996 through 2004, sales of scrapbooking products increased across the United States. In 2005, annual sales flattened for the first time after many back to back years of double growth. From 2006 through 2010 traditional scrapbooking sales have declined, while digital forms of scrapbooking have grown. Traditional scrapbooking sales for 2010 have declined to about $1.6 billion in annual sales from a peak of about $2.5 billion in 2005.

During that same time frame the number of independent scrapbooking stores declined from a high of 4,200 to about 1,200 independent storefronts. The number of scrapbooking manufacturers also declined in that same period from a high of 800 to under 250.

Common idioms

Journaling
In addition to the collection of photographs, tickets, postcards, and other memorabilia, journaling is often a principal element in modern scrapbooks. Journaling is text that describes, explains, or accents the photographs on a scrapbook page. Contemporary journaling can take many forms. It can be reflective and story-like, take a reportive tone, or simply be a list of words. Journaling may also include song lyrics, quotations, and poems. The value of journaling lies in the fact that it provides an account of family histories that may otherwise not be preserved.

Many consider journaling one of the most important elements of any scrapbook. Journaling is a personal choice and it can describe the event, the photographs, or relate feelings and emotions. Handwritten journaling is considered best by some scrapbookers who see handwriting as valuable for posterity, but many people journal on the computer and print it onto a variety of surfaces including vellum, tape, ribbon, and paper.

Sketches
Scrapbookers will sometimes refer to sketches for inspiration for their pages. Sketches are a hand-drawn layout showing where to position photos, titles, journaling and embellishments. It gives novice scrapbookers somewhere to begin if they are not experienced with balancing the layout correctly. Scrapbookers can interpret the sketch in any way they choose; it is a great starting point when you have scrappers-block. There have been many sketchbooks published and scrapbooking magazines always offer sketches as part of their content.

See also
Baby book, a record of a baby's birth and growth
Commonplace book, formerly a way to compile knowledge, usually by writing information into books
Cricut, a home-scrapbooking machine.
Media preservation
Preservation (library and archival science)
Silva rerum, a specific type of a book, a multi-generational chronicle, kept by many Polish noble families from the 16th through 18th centuries

References

External links

      

 

Handicrafts
Paper art
Articles containing video clips
Books by type